The Geographical Bulletin is a biannual open-access peer-reviewed academic journal published by the international geographic honor society Gamma Theta Upsilon ( or GTU). It covers all aspects of geography and focuses on student-written and student-led research. While the journal focuses on student research, being a student is not a requirement for consideration. The editor-in-chief is Casey D. Allen of University of the West Indies at Cave Hill.

History
Gamma Theta Upsilon established the journal in 1970 to provide an outlet for geography-focused student research. In May 2018, the journal began publishing online-only open access, and made the entire archive available for free.

See also
American Association of Geographers
Geographic Information Systems
National Council for Geographic Education

References

External links

 Geography journals
 English-language journals
Open access journals
 Publications established in 1970
Biannual journals